Brotherhood (Ikhwène) is a short film, directed by Meryam Joobeur and released in September 2018.

Summary
A co-production of companies from Canada, Tunisia, Qatar and Sweden, the film explores the tensions within a Tunisian family when a man who has been away for several years returns home with a new Syrian wife who wears the full niqab, igniting his father's suspicions that his son has been working for the Islamic State of Iraq and the Levant.

Inspiration
The film's title was chosen to reflect both the familial connotations of the word "brotherhood" and its use in the name of the controversial Islamist organization Muslim Brotherhood.

Accolades
The film premiered at the 2018 Toronto International Film Festival, where it won the award for Best Canadian Short Film. In December 2018, it was named in the TIFF's year-end Canada's Top Ten list.

At the 21st Quebec Cinema Awards in 2019, the film won the Prix Iris for Best Short Film. The film received a nomination for the Best Live Action Short Film at the 92nd Academy Awards.

References

External links

MUBI

2018 films
Qatari drama films
Swedish short films
Swedish drama films
Arabic-language Canadian films
Tunisian short films
Tunisian drama films
Canadian drama short films
2010s Canadian films
2010s Swedish films